William C. Clark (ne Oistacher; October 8, 1899 – March 21, 1988) was an American boxer who competed in the 1920 Summer Olympics. Clark was affiliated with the Hermann Institute of Philadelphia. He died in Miami, Florida.

In 1920 he finished fourth in the welterweight class after losing the bronze medal bout to Frederick Kolberg.

References

1899 births
1988 deaths
Boxers from Philadelphia
Welterweight boxers
Olympic boxers of the United States
Boxers at the 1920 Summer Olympics
Place of birth missing
American male boxers